Yedid Nefesh is the title of a piyyut and zemer. It is usually sung on Shabbat.

Traditions and origin

Some sing it between Minchah (afternoon prayer) of Friday and the beginning of Kabbalat Shabbat (literally: receiving or greeting the Sabbath—a collection of psalms usually sung to welcome in the Shabbat queen, as it were, the restful contentment that descends from above during nightfall on Friday).

It is sung by many Jews during Seudah Shlishit (the third meal on Shabbat; the first is on Friday night, the second on Saturday lunch, and the third on Saturday before nightfall).

Many Chassidim say or sing it every morning before beginning to the Pesukei dezimra section of Shacharit in order to arouse their love of God in preparation for the praises of Pesukei dezimra.

This poem is commonly attributed to the sixteenth century Sephardic kabbalist, Rabbi Elazar ben Moshe Azikri (1533-1600), who first published it in Sefer Charedim (published in Venice 1601), but Azikri did not claim authorship of it and there have been other suggested authors (e.g. Judah Halevi, or Israel Najara). Azikri's philosophy centred around the intense love one must feel for God, a theme that is evident in this piyyut (see references). The first letters of each of the four verses make up the four letter name of God, known in English as the tetragrammaton.

Text

The words are as follows:

Notes on the text 

The text above is the "conventional" text appearing in most Ashkenaz liturgies (including the ArtScroll siddur) down to our day.  There have been, over the centuries, many variants in different published prayerbooks.  The conventional text differs from the text first printed in 1601, and both the conventional and the 1601 texts differed from Azikri's manuscript (both the manuscript and the 1601 printing were in unpointed Hebrew).

Verse 3, line 2:  בּן  אהובך     bein ahuvekha,  translated here as "the son of Your beloved" is, in other translations of the same text, rendered as "your beloved son" (or child) or "your loving son".  Some Sefardic/Mizrahi prayerbooks rewrite this phrase as עם אהוּבך   am ahuvakh, "your beloved people" (e.g. The Orot Sephardic Shabbat Siddur, ed by Rabbi Eliezer Toledano (1995) p. 571).  But the first printing and Azikri's manuscript both have bein ahuvekha.

In 1985, the Rabbinical Assembly of the Conservative Momement included a version of the hymn in Siddur Sim Shalom based on the author’s autograph manuscript, found in the library of the Jewish Theological Seminary. Rabbi Azikri's manuscript of this song (viewable on opensiddur.org) varies in several spots from the conventional text. The Hebrew and English text used in the Koren Sacks Siddur (2009) followed this manuscript—although the Authorised Daily Prayer Book (4th ed. 2006, pages 576-577) translated and annotated by the same Rabbi Jonathan Sacks used the conventional printed text. (This was also the reading found in the first publication in 1601 and in Siddur Sim Shalom.)

Verse 3, line 4, both the manuscript and first printing omit m'heirah (speedily), but in line 6 חוּשׁה  ḥushah (hasten) in the manuscript and 1601 publication was replaced in the later printings by v'ḥusah (take pity).

Verse 3, line 5, both the manuscript and the 1601 printing had אנא אלי  An[n]a Eli  instead of Eileh, so the line changes from "These are my heart's desire" to "Please, My God, [You are] my heart's desire".  So the manuscript says, for verse 3 lines 4 & 5, "O, my Lord, [You who are] my heart's desire,  hurry please."  But the conventional printings (such as ArtScroll) have it, "My heart desired only these, so please have pity."

The 1601 printing indicated that the last line of each verse (in the printing above, the fifth and sixth lines of each verse) was to be repeated.  Jacobson mentions an earlier (apparently circa 1870) prayerbook that similarly attempted to restore the text according to the 1601 printing, which met with such condemnation (mostly over the substitution of "maidservant" for "gladness", though both the 1601 printing and Azikri's manuscript support this) from influential Hasidic rabbis that the editor was forced to print replacement pages with the conventional (if erroneous) text.

Azikri's handwritten manuscript of this poem was discovered (by the great scholar Meir Benayahu) in the library of Jewish Theological Seminary of America in the mid-20th century. As a result, the Siddur Rinat Yisrael (Ashkenaz ed. by Rabbi Shlomo Tal, 1977) p. 189, the Koren-Sacks, and the Conservative movement's Siddur Sim Shalom, used the same Hebrew text as handwritten original.  In a subsequent commentary to his prayerbook, Rabbi Tal published a photocopy of that handwritten original (Tal, Ha-Siddur Be-histalsheluto, 1984, page 68).  Tal also noted that a few earlier prayerbooks (Livorno 1910 and Jerusalem 1953) also printed versions that restored "maidservant" from the 1601 edition.

References

 Azikri, Elazar ben Moshe (Venice 1601), Sefer Charedim (the original printed version is on page 45; in the flyleaf of this copy someone has pasted what appears to be two pages from the 1984 commentary on the Rinat Yisrael version with a photocopy of Azikri's handwritten copy.
 Chwat, Dr. Ezra (June 29, 2010). Who wrote the poem Yedid Nefesh
 Feldheim. The Essential Shiron-Birkon, p. 90.
"Hasidic Musician" (Aug. 4, 2009). The Koren Siddur on Yedid Nefesh
 Jacobson, B.S. (1981) The Sabbath Service:  An exposition and analysis of its structure, contents, language and ideas, Sinai Publishing, Tel-Aviv, pages 371-374.
 Rabbinical Assembly and United Synagogue of Conservative Judaism. Siddur Sim Shalom, p. 252
 Rothman Foundation. The NCSY Bencher, p. 51.
 Sacks, Jonathan (2009). The Koren Sacks Siddur, with introduction, translation and commentary by Rabbi Sir Jonathan Sacks. Koren Publishers, Jerusalem, pages 308-309 and 688-689. 
 Scherman, Nosson, Meir Zlotowitz, Sheah Brander. The Complete Artscroll Siddur (סדור קול יעקב), Mesorah Publications, p. 591.
 Scherman, Nosson, Benjamin Yudin, Sheah Brander. Artscroll Transliterated Linear Siddur, Sabbath and Festival (סדור זכרון אברהם), Mesorah Publications, p. 82.
 Siddur Rinat Yisrael - Hotza'at Moreshet, p. 180

External links
 Full transliteration and translation in an article on Shabbos afternoon and the third meal by Lori Palatnik for Aish.com
 Transliteration and translation of Zalman Goldstein and Chaim Fogelman's Ashkenaz-style recording for chabad.org
 Sephardi transliteration of the first verse
 Yedid nefesh YouTube
 Downloadable sheet with song and linear transliteration and translation from Siddur Chaverim Kol Yisrael

Recordings
 Recordings, text, translation, transliteration from The Zemirot Database
 Instrumental accompaniment to the first few lines
 Details of the first verse with audio from project z'mirot
 A polyphonic take on the traditional Ashkenazi tune, sung by Emilia Cataldo
 Video of a live performance of the song in the Moroccan Andalusian style by Binyamin Buzaglo and the Israeli Andalusian Orchestra (התזמורת האנדלוסית הישראלית).
 Multiple melodies of various sources.

Jewish liturgical poems
Shabbat
Hebrew words and phrases in Jewish prayers and blessings
Zemirot